Multiple myeloma tumor-associated protein 2 is a protein in humans that is encoded by the MMTP2 gene.

References

Further reading 

Genes on human chromosome 1
Uncharacterized proteins